The 1966 Mr. Olympia contest was an IFBB professional bodybuilding competition held in September  1966 at the Brooklyn Academy of Music in Brooklyn, New York.  It was the 2nd Mr. Olympia competition held.

Results

Notable events

 Larry Scott wins Mr. Olympia for a second time, and announces his retirement from bodybuilding

External links 
 Mr. Olympia

 1966
1966 in American sports
1966 in bodybuilding